Type I inositol-3,4-bisphosphate 4-phosphatase is an enzyme that in humans is encoded by the INPP4A gene.

INPP4A encodes the inositol polyphosphate 4-phosphatase type I, one of the enzymes involved in phosphatidylinositol signaling pathways. This enzyme removes the phosphate group at position 4 of the inositol ring from inositol 3,4-bisphosphate.

References

Further reading